The Marine Corps Air Ground Combat Center (MCAGCC), also known as 29 Palms, is the largest United States Marine Corps base. The base covers a total area of 596,288 acres (931.7 sq mi).

It was a census-designated place (CDP) officially known as Twentynine Palms Base located adjacent to the city of Twentynine Palms in southern San Bernardino County, California. As of the 2000 census, the base had a total population of 8,413. The zip code of the base is 92278; base housing's zip code is 92277. The CDP was discontinued prior to the 2010 census.

History 
From 1942 through July 1944, during World War II, the airfield at Twentynine Palms was utilized by the U.S. Army Air Force for primary flight training. What is now the "Marine Corps Air Ground Combat Center" was taken over by the Eleventh Naval District, headquartered in San Diego, as Naval Auxiliary Air Station Twentynine Palms, in July 1944. After the war, its future was uncertain. Then, on August 20, 1952, Marine Corps Base Camp Pendleton Headquarters issued Post Order 343 creating the Marine Corps Training Center, Twentynine Palms.

During the Korean War, it became obvious that more live-fire training ranges were needed. Pendleton's Marines looked to the abandoned Condor Field, a World War II Army and Navy glider base located in the vicinity of what is now mainside. The base was designated on February 6, 1953, as Marine Corps Training Center, Twentynine Palms. By February 1, 1957, it grew to base status and was designated as Marine Corps Base, Twentynine Palms, Calif.

Only 70 Marines comprised the detachment at the center. Manned by Marines from Camp Pendleton, its primary mission was to prepare the new base for the arrival of permanent personnel. By mid-December, 1952, a fresh 3rd Marine Division, with assistance from the 12th Marine Regiment, conducted the first large-scale, live-fire field exercise aboard the base. The exercise gave Marines a glimpse of the facility's potential and foreshadowed the large-scale combined arms exercises for which the base is known.

In 1976, under the command of Brigadier General Ernest R. Reid, Jr., work began to add an expeditionary airfield to the base's growing infrastructure. Following completion of the expeditionary airfield, its name was changed to Marine Corps Air Ground Combat Training Center on October 1, 1978, and changed yet once more to Marine Corps Air Ground Combat Center (MCAGCC) on February 16, 1979.  It was also during this time that plans for the combined arms exercises were conceived.  Supplanting an earlier exercise known as Desert Palm Tree, the new combined arms exercises were remarkable in two respects: the practice of combined arms, and live-fire and movement during the exercises were unprecedented in scale. Just as noteworthy was the creation of a Tactical Exercise Control Center with the primary purpose of controlling, instructing and critiquing the exercises. In the words of base historian, Colonel Verle E. Ludwig, "Twentynine Palms was to be a permanent 'combined-arms exercise college' for all of the Marine Corps."

On October 1, 2000, after 21 years as MCAGCC, the command was designated as Marine Air Ground Task Force Training Command, Twentynine Palms, California. This designation accompanied a change in policy that placed MAGTF Training Command under the auspices of Training and Education Command, Headquarters Marine Corps, MCCDC, Marine Corps Base Quantico, Virginia. The expeditionary airfield and surrounding spartan accommodations for visiting units was named "Camp Wilson".

The base is currently home to one of the largest military training areas in the nation. The program known as Mojave Viper has become the model of pre-Operation Iraqi Freedom deployment training. The majority of units in the Marine Corps deploying to Iraq were trained at Mojave Viper or a mixed training venue using the Mountain Warfare Training Center (south of Lake Tahoe) for Afghanistan. Live fire exercises, artillery, tank, and close air support training are used for training, in addition to the sprawling "Combat Town," a  fabricated Middle Eastern village, complete with a mosque, native role-players, an "IED Alley," and other immersive touches.

In August 2008, the Marine Corps submitted a land withdrawal application to the Bureau of Land Management for approximately  contiguous to base as part of an ongoing study by the Marine Corps for possible base expansion, along with the establishment of corresponding special-use airspace, necessary to train a Marine expeditionary brigade at the Combat Center.

Based units 

 7th Marine Regiment
 3rd Battalion 11th Marines
 3rd LAR Battalion
 Co D, 3d Assault Amphibian Battalion
 MWSS-374
 CLB-7
 MCCES
 MCTOG
 MCLOG

Geography 
Twentynine Palms Base is located within the Morongo Basin and the High Desert region of the Mojave Desert in Southern California. MCAGCC Twentynine Palms is approximately 98 miles from the Marine Corps Logistics Base Barstow, Barstow, California. It is approximately 111 miles from the Barstow-Daggett Airport in Daggett, California.

According to the United States Census Bureau, the base has a total area of 1.4 mi2 (3.7 km2).  This area is all land with none covered by water.  This area covers only the main cantonment, which includes the base housing; the entire installation is far larger, with 931.7 mi2 (2,413.2 km2) of surface area, all land. There was a resident population of 14,090 on this territory as of the 2000 census.

The training area is also characterized with ancient lava flows, as well as dry lake beds and arroyos (or wadis) that fill quickly during rain, presenting the danger of powerful floods and washouts that can move armored vehicles. Many abandoned mines dot the terrain, as well as unexploded ordnance and shrapnel, making unauthorized travel in the training areas dangerous.

The climate is described best as arid and upland desert. Summer temperatures can peak at 120 °F and bottom at 15 °F in the winter, with an annual average of 67 °F. Precipitation averages four inches (102 mm) annually, most often in the fall and winter months. Weather is generally clear and sunny with low humidity.

Demographics 

As of the census of 2000, there were 8,413 people, 912 households, and 904 families residing on the base. The population density was 2,287.5/km2 (5,935.8/mi2). There were 1,006 housing units at an average density of 273.5/km2 (709.8/mi2). The racial makeup of the base was 70.3% White, 10.4% African American, 1.4% Native American, 3.1% Asian, 0.3% Pacific Islander, 9.5% from other races, and 5.1% from two or more races. 19.6% of the population were Hispanic or Latino of any race.

There were 912 households, out of which 73.1% had children under the age of 18 living with them, 94.5% were married couples living together, 3.5% had a female householder with no husband present, and 0.8% were non-families. 0.8% of all households were made up of individuals, and <0.1% had someone living alone who was 65 years of age or older.  The average household size was 3.4 and the average family size was 3.4.

The age distribution of the base is: 15.4% under the age of 18, 67.0% from 18 to 24, 16.8% from 25 to 44, 0.7% from 45 to 64, and <0.1% who were 65 years of age or older. The median age was 21 years. For every 100 females, there were 404.1 males. For every 100 females age 18 and over, there were 596.3 males. These statistics were consistent with the area's military status.

The median income for a household on the base was $29,500, and the median income for a family was $29,594. Males had a median income of $14,111 versus $17,014 for females. The per capita income for the base was $12,615.  12.1% of the population and 11.9% of families were below the poverty line.  Out of the total population, 14.0% of those under the age of 18 and 0.0% of those 65 and older were living below the poverty line.

Government 

List of commanders 

 MajGen Lewis A. Craparotta, July 10, 2014 - July 10, 2016
 MajGen Roger B. Turner Jr., July 10, 2016 - August 13, 2020
 MajGen William Jurney, August 13, 2020 - June 4, 2021
 MajGen Austin E. Renforth, June 4, 2021 – present

See also 
 Condor Field
 Twentynine Palms Strategic Expeditionary Landing Field
 List of United States Marine Corps installations

References

Further reading

External links 

An Insider's Guide to USMC Bases
Official Facebook page
MCAGCC 29 Palms Base Overview & PCS Information (MarineCorpsUSA.org)
U.S. Marine Corps Combat Training Center: Census Tract 104.02, San Bernardino County, California United States Census Bureau

Twentynine Palms
Military installations in California
Military facilities in the Mojave Desert
Military in San Bernardino County, California
Twentynine Palms, California
Former census-designated places in California